Taizo Ishida (16 November 1886 - 18 September 1979) was a Japanese businessman. He was the president, chairman, and advisor of Toyota Industries Corporation and Toyota Motor Corporation. He was called "The Great Banto of Toyota", a Japanese title given to the highest of the merchants for his services in rebuilding Toyota as a successful car making business.  He is succeeded as president of Toyota Motors Co by Fukio Nakagawa.

See also 
 Kiichiro Toyoda
 Eiji Toyoda

References 

1886 births
Place of birth missing
1979 deaths
Place of death missing
Toyota people
20th-century Japanese businesspeople
Japanese business executives